Gigerwaldsee is a reservoir in the municipality of Pfäfers, in the Canton of St. Gallen, Switzerland.

The arch dam Gigerwald was completed in 1976. It has a height of 147 m.

See also
List of lakes of Switzerland
List of mountain lakes of Switzerland

External links

Lakes of the canton of St. Gallen
Reservoirs in Switzerland
Arch dams